Farmers' High School is a national historic district located on the campus of the Pennsylvania State University in University Park / State College, Centre County, Pennsylvania.  The district includes 37 contributing buildings and 1 contributing object in the Old Campus area of Penn State. The district includes Old Main (1930), the Faculty Club (1976), Nittany Lion Inn (1930), Recreation Hall (1928), West Halls Complex (1922-1937), University Club (1916), the President's Mansion (1864, 1940), Pattee Library (1938), Schwab Auditorium (1902), and a number of fraternities, sororities, and classroom buildings. The buildings reflect a number of popular early-20th-century architectural styles including Colonial Revival, Classical Revival, and Georgian Revival. A focal point of the district is the Nittany Lion Shrine (1942).

It was added to the National Register of Historic Places in 1981.

Gallery

References

School buildings on the National Register of Historic Places in Pennsylvania
Historic districts on the National Register of Historic Places in Pennsylvania
Colonial Revival architecture in Pennsylvania
Neoclassical architecture in Pennsylvania
Buildings and structures in Centre County, Pennsylvania
National Register of Historic Places in Centre County, Pennsylvania